Crivelli Redoubt, also known as Barriera Redoubt or Armier Redoubt, is a redoubt in Armier Bay, Mellieħa, Malta. It was built by the Order of Saint John in 1715–1716 as part of a series of coastal fortifications around the Maltese Islands. Today, the redoubt is in good condition.

In the early 19th century, Crivelli Redoubt was also known as La Canniere Redoubt.

History
Crivelli Redoubt was built in 1715–1716 as part of the first building programme of coastal fortifications in Malta. It was part of a chain of fortifications that defended the northern coast of Malta, which also included Aħrax Tower, several batteries, redoubts and entrenchments. The nearest fortifications to Crivelli Redoubt are Vendôme Battery to the west and the Louvier Entrenchment to the east.

The redoubt was named after the Prior of Capua, Ferdinando Crivelli, who financed the money needed for its construction. It was probably designed by the French engineer Philip Maigret.

The redoubt consists of a pentagonal platform with a low parapet. A rectangular blockhouse with two rooms is located at the centre of its gorge, and the main entrance has an inscription making reference to the knight Crivelli. The redoubt is surrounded by a ditch, which is partially rock hewn. It was not armed with any artillery.

Present day
By the early 21st century, the redoubt was in ruins, with the left wall and part of the roof of the blockhouse having been collapsed, with the façade being unstable. The damage has since been repaired.

Crivelli Redoubt is the best preserved redoubt in Mellieħa, since the others have been demolished or are in a worse state of preservation.

References

External links

National Inventory of the Cultural Property of the Maltese Islands

Redoubts in Malta
Mellieħa
Hospitaller fortifications in Malta
Military installations established in 1715
Limestone buildings in Malta
National Inventory of the Cultural Property of the Maltese Islands
18th-century fortifications
1715 establishments in Malta
18th Century military history of Malta